The Ministry of Women and Gender Equality of Chile is an entity created during the late part of the second presidency of Michelle Bachelet (2014−2018) after the releasing of the N°20.820 Decrete of Law in 2016.

Its current minister is Antonia Orellana.

List of representatives

References

External Link
 

Government ministries of Chile
Women's ministries
Gender equality ministries
Women in Chile